Michele Macfarlane (born 1948) is an amateur horse trainer from the United States, who competes in the sport of saddle seat. She has been one of the leading amateur trainers and riders in the sport for over 40 years.  Macfarlane resides in San Diego, California and is Marshal for the Scripps Miramar Ranch Saddlebreds parade unit.

Life and career 

She was born in 1948 to Everett Conley Davis, and Ellen Browning Scripps Davis. Her father was a lawyer and the grandson of Paschal Conley and her mother the granddaughter of E.W. Scripps and niece of Ellen Browning Scripps.

She grew up on her family’s Scripps Miramar Ranch, near San Diego. When she was five her mother introduced her to the family horse riding tradition. Horses gave her hay fever, meaning she initially disliked working with them but came to appreciate her role around the age of ten when her mother bought a solid-colored Saddlebred and put her and the horse in training with Bill Rowan. Thanks to her mother’s love of both parades and pinto horses, she had the innovation of breeding spotted parade horses of Saddlebred bloodlines, eventually taking part in San Diego New Year's parade in 1962.

This became a tradition and the 129th Rose Parade in 2018 was Macfarlane and the Scripps Miramar Ranch’s 34th appearance

In 1979 she bought Sky Watch whose legendary career earned him the title of Five-gaited Horse of the Century by American Saddlebred magazine. Michele rode him to his fourth and final World Grand Championship in 1988 and became the first woman amateur to ever achieve that win. She would repeat that  win with Memories Citation in 1996 and CCV Casey's Final Countdown in 2007. She remains the only person to have entered the Five-Gaited Championship three times and winning all three times.

Early years 

On May 26, 1985, Michele and Ellen Scripps Davis impressed the coaching division of the Devon Horse Show with their bay Hackney four.

Amateur career 1988–2018 

1988
 1st, World Championship Horse Show Five-Gaited Championship, Freedom Hall, Louisville Kentucky. On Sky Watch Here she became the first female rider to win the five-gaited stake at the World's Grand Championship

1996  
 1st, World Championship Horse Show Five-Gaited Championship, Freedom Hall, Louisville Kentucky. On Memories' Citation
 Lurline Roth Sportsmanship Award at the American Saddlebred Horse Association Convention

1998
 Inducted into The Kentucky State Fair Hall of Fame
 At the Winter Olympics in Nagano, Japan, Macfarlane's spotted Saddlebreds featured in the closing ceremony

2007
 1st, World Championship Horse Show Five-Gaited Championship, Freedom Hall, Louisville Kentucky. On SA (CCV) Casey’s Final Countdown Here Macfarlane became one of only two living riders to have won the Five-Gaited World’s Grand Championship three times with three different horses

2009
 Meritorious Service Award at the American Saddlebred Horse Association Convention

2012
 Represented the United States in the Queen's Diamond Jubilee celebration. Macfarlane's Californian Stagecoach was introduced by Helen Mirren.

2013
 Gordon Jenkins International Award at the American Saddlebred Horse Association Convention

Personal life 

She is the great grand daughter of Paschal Conley meaning she is related to the legendary Jess "Longshot" Conley, who ran the Kentucky Derby in 1911. On February 16, 1998 both Ellen Scripps Davis and Everett Conley Davis were tragically killed in a house fire. Michele took over the ranch and continued the family legacy, even winning the ASHA Meritorious Service Award at the American Saddlebred Horse Association Convention that same year.

References 

1948 births
Living people
American female equestrians
People from San Diego
American Saddlebred breeders and trainers
21st-century American women